Donji Orovac is a village in the municipality of Trebinje, Republika Srpska, Bosnia and Herzegovina.

Notable people 

 Jovan Deretić, Serbian historian and author of Serbian literary history
 Jovan I. Deretić, Serbian publicist, writer and historian

References

Villages in Republika Srpska
Populated places in Trebinje